An auto row or auto mall is a business cluster with multiple car dealerships in a single neighborhood or road. Auto rows are distinct from car supermarkets which are a single, large dealership.

Economics
Auto rows, like mall food courts, are an example of the economies of agglomeration. Even though being grouped together increases immediate competition, the auto row becomes more of destination for consumers and benefits all the dealerships.  Many consumers may want to test drive automobiles from multiple companies before making a purchase and the auto row provides one stop shopping. Competing dealerships also often share advertising costs to promote their single destination under an agreed-upon marketing name.  Auto rows attract ancillary businesses including car washes, insurance offices, and body shops that benefit all of the dealerships.

Geography
Central Place Theory may explain why destination stores do better when centrally located. 
  Also, in some areas, local zoning may exclude car dealerships from many retail districts so that locating in an auto row becomes less about market forces and more about government planning.

Traditionally, car dealership had small window front showrooms. Later, most car dealerships converted to large parking lot-based stores with integrated parts and service departments.  In many case, an auto row is a vehicle-themed historic district rather than a current location to purchase cars.

Examples

 Automobile Alley Historic District, Mobile, Alabama
 Automobile Alley, Oklahoma City, Oklahoma
 Automobile Row (Omaha, Nebraska)
 34 Avenue, Edmonton, Alberta
 Broadway Auto Row, Oakland, California
 Capitol Expressway, San Jose, California
 Cerritos Auto Square, Cerritos, California
 Motor Row District, Chicago, Illinois
 Driver's Village, built on the site of a dead mall in Syracuse, New York

See also
 Milwaukee Junction, a former agglomeration of auto manufacturers.
 List of historic filling stations

References

Auto dealerships

Shopping districts and streets by type